Imperial Italy may refer to:
Roman Italy, the Italian peninsula during the Roman Empire
Kingdom of Italy (Holy Roman Empire), a constituent kingdom of the Holy Roman Empire
Italian Empire, Italy's colonies in the age of neo-imperialism
Italian imperialism under Fascism